Andrzej Ryszard Niemczyk (16 January 1944 – 2 June 2016) was a Polish volleyball player and coach.

He was the coach of the Poland women's national volleyball team that competed at the 2003 Women's European Volleyball Championship, and the 2005 Women's European Volleyball Championship.

Niemczyk was the true father of Kinga Maculewicz, according to her own statement and who has represented , and father of Maculewicz's half-sisters Małgorzata, Saskia and Natascha. All of his daughters are also volleyball players.

References

Sportspeople from Łódź
1944 births
2016 deaths
Polish men's volleyball players
Polish volleyball coaches